This is a partial list of aircraft acquired in China prior to the start of the Second Sino-Japanese war on 7 July 1937, and an incomplete list of Chinese warlords involved in the acquisition of these aircraft, many for the inventory of their own aviation units.

Aeromarine 39B
Aichi AB-3
Ansaldo A.300-4
Armstrong Whitworth Atlas
Armstrong Whitworth A.W.16
Arrow Sport
Ansaldo SVA
Avro 504
Avro 594 Avian IV
Avro 621 Tutor
Avro 624 Six
BFW M.23
Blackburn Lincock III
Boeing 218
Boeing Model 281
Boeing 247
Breda Ba.25
Breda Ba.27
Breda Ba.28
Breguet 14
Breguet 19
Breguet 273
Caudron C.59
Caudron G.2
Caudron G.3
Caudron G.4
Caproni Ca.101
Caproni Ca.111
Curtiss Shrike
Curtiss Condor II
Curtiss Hawk II
Curtiss Hawk III
Curtiss Model D
Curtiss Falcon
Curtiss HS-2L
Curtiss JN-4
Curtiss Robin
de Havilland Dragon Rapide
de Havilland Gipsy Moth
de Havilland Moth
de Havilland Puss Moth
Dewoitine D.27C
Douglas DC-2
Douglas O-2MC
Etrich Taube
Fairchild KR-34CA
Fairey Fox III, IV
Fiat B.R.3
Fiat C.R.30
Fiat C.R.32
Fleet Model 7
Fleet Model 10
Flushing AP-1
Focke-Wulf S 24
Focke-Wulf Fw 44
Fokker C.V
Fokker Super Universal
Friesley Falcon
Handley Page Type O/7
Heinkel He 66
Heinkel He 111A
Heinkel He 116
Junkers F.13
Junkers W 33
Junkers W 34
Junkers A 20
Junkers A 35 
Junkers Ju 52
Junkers Ju 86
Junkers Ju 160
Junkers K 47
Junkers K 53
Klemm L 26 II
Loening-Keystone C2H Air Yacht
Martin B-10
Messerschmitt M 18d  
Morane-Saulnier M.S.225
Nakajima Ko-4 (Nieuport-Delage NiD.29)
Naval Air Establishment Beeng
Naval Air Establishment Chiang Hung
Naval Air Establishment Char
Naval Air Establishment Chiang Gaen
Naval Air Establishment Chiang Hau
Naval Air Establishment Ding
Naval Air Establishment Nin Hai
Naval Air Establishment Wu
Naval Air Establishment Yee
Northrop Alpha
Northrop 2E, 2F Gamma
Polikarpov R-1
Polikarpov R-5
Polikarpov U-2
Potez 25
Potez 36
Raab-Katzenstein RK.2 Pelikan
Rumpler Taube
Ryan B-1 Brougham
Schoettler I
Schreck FBA.17
Savoia-Marchetti S.72
Sikorsky S-38-BH 
Stinson SM-1F Detroiter
Udet U 12 Flamingo
Vickers Vimy Commercial
Vickers VIM
Vought V.65C Corsair
Waco 240-A/CSO Straightwing
Waco ATO Taperwing
Waco CTO Taperwing
Westland Wapiti VIII

Warlord air forces of China 
Bai Chongxi/Li Zongren (Guangxi Clique)
Cao Kun/Feng Yü-hsiang (Zhili Clique)
Chen Jitang (Guangdong Clique)
Duan Qirui (Beiyang Clique)
Liu Xiang (Sichuan Clique)
Lu Yongxiang (Anhui Clique)
Tang Jiyao (Yunnan Clique)
Zhang Zuolin (Fengtian Clique)
Sheng Shicai (Xinjiang Clique)

Various aircraft in Chinese provincial/warlord service, along with overseas-Chinese volunteer pilots, had crossed-over into the centralized command (ROCAF) of the nominally Nationalist Air Force of China by 1937 in preparations for the impending war against the Empire of Japan.

See also 
 Air Warfare of WWII from the Sino-Japanese War perspective
 Feng Ru
 Li Ruyan
 Etienne Tsu
 Wong Tsu
 Sen Yet Young
World War II equipment used by Chinese forces

References

China aircraft used before 1937
Aircraft